Cuamba Airport  is an airport serving Cuamba, a city in the Niassa Province in Mozambique. The airport is in the southern part of the city and is a major airport in the province of Niassa in central Mozambique.

There are no scheduled flights in or out of the city. Kaya Airlines is the major airline that comes to the city, with non-scheduled flights from Nampula.

Facilities

References

External links
 Niassa province tourism
 

Airports in Mozambique
Buildings and structures in Niassa Province